The Richard W. Lyman Award was presented for five years, from 2002 to 2006, by the National Humanities Center. It recognized scholars who have advanced the humanities through the use of information technology, and was given only to male recipients

Another award with the same name was started in 1983 by Stanford University.

Both awards are named after Professor Richard Wall Lyman.

Award recipients

Awarded by National Humanities Center
 2002 Jerome McGann
 2003 Roy Rosenzweig
 2004 Robert K. Englund
 2005 John M. Unsworth
 2006 Willard McCarty

Recently awarded by Stanford University
 2011 Lyman Van Slyke
 2012 Hank Greely
 2013 Larry Diamond
 2015 Jeffrey R. Koseff
 2016 James Fox
 2017 Abbas Milani
 2018 Tina Seelig
 2019 Michael McFaul

External links
 , National Humanities Center
 , Stanford University

See also

 List of computer-related awards

References

Humanities awards
Computer-related awards
American education awards
Awards established in 2002
Awards disestablished in 2006
2002 establishments in North Carolina